Scott Roberts (born 5 June 1996) is a Scottish footballer who plays as a midfielder for Albion Rovers.

Career
Roberts, who started his career with Rangers, joined Scottish Championship side Raith Rovers on a short-term loan deal on 19 July 2016, and subsequently signed permanently for the club on 11 January 2017.

After being released by Raith at the end of the 2016–17 season, Roberts signed for Scottish League Two club Annan Athletic on 16 September 2017.

Roberts moved to Elgin City in January 2019.

On 5 July 2019, Roberts signed for Albion Rovers.

Career statistics

References

External links

1996 births
Living people
Scottish footballers
Association football midfielders
Rangers F.C. players
Raith Rovers F.C. players
Annan Athletic F.C. players
Elgin City F.C. players
Albion Rovers F.C. players
Scottish Professional Football League players
Stirling Albion F.C. players